Kapp or KAPP may refer to:
Kapp (headcovering), a headcovering worn by many Anabaptist Christian women
Kapp, Norway, a village in Østre Toten municipality in Innlandet county, Norway
Kapp Records, a record label
KAPP (TV), the ABC affiliate (channel 35) for Yakima, Washington, United States
Kenya African People's Party, a defunct political party in Kenya

Kapp is a surname of German origin. It may refer to:
Kärt Jänes-Kapp (1960–2015), Estonian journalist and editor
Alex Kapp Horner (born 1969), American actress
Alexander Kapp (German educator and editor) (1799–1869), German editor and educator
Alexander Kapp (dermatologist and allergist) (born 1955) German dermatologist and allergist
Andy Kapp (born 1967), German curler
Ardeth G. Kapp (born 1931), Canadian religious leader
Artur Kapp (1878–1952), Estonian composer
Charlie Kapp , German curler
Colin Kapp (1928–2007), British author
Dietloff Kapp (born 1925), German modern pentathlete
Edmond Xavier Kapp (1890–1978), British artist
Erhardt Kapp (born 1959), Romanian-American soccer player and coach
Ernst Kapp (1808–1896), German-American philosopher and geographer
Eugen Kapp (1908–1996), Estonian composer
Friedrich Kapp (1824–1884), German-American attorney, author and politician
Gisbert Kapp (1852–1922), Austrian-English electrotechnician
Helen Kapp (1901–1978), British artist and curator
Helmut Kapp (died 1943), Nazi German war criminal
Jack Kapp (1901–1949), American music entrepreneur
Janice Kapp Perry (born 1938), American missionary and religious songwriter
Joe Kapp (born 1938), American and Canadian football player
Karl William Kapp (1910–1976), German-American economist
Luisa Kapp-Young (1835–1919), Austrian dramatic operatic soprano, musical educator, essayist
Marizanne Kapp (born 1990), South African cricketer
Mary Eugenia Kapp (1909–1983), American chemist
Richard Kapp (1936–2006), American conductor
Uli Kapp (born 1971), German curler
Villem Kapp (1913–1964), Estonian composer, organist and music teacher
William Kapp (1891–1969), American architect
Wolfgang Kapp (1858–1922), German political activist and journalist, leader of the Kapp Putsch

Käpp 
Osvald Käpp (1905–1995), Estonian wrestler

See also
Kapp Werkzeugmaschinen
Kopp (disambiguation)
Capp (disambiguation)

German-language surnames
Estonian-language surnames